Three ships of the French Navy have borne the name Mytho or My-Tho, after the Vietnamese city of Mỹ Tho, to commemorate the Capture of Mỹ Tho in 1861:

Ships 
  (1934), a gunboat, lead ship of her class .

Notes and references

Notes

References

Bibliography 
 
 

French Navy ship names